Bryan Scott Smith (born May 21, 1979), is a retired American mixed martial artist. A professional competitor since 2001, Smith was a contestant on The Ultimate Fighter: The Comeback, and has competed for the UFC, Strikeforce, EliteXC and PFC. He is the former WEC Light Heavyweight Champion.

Background
Smith was born in Reno, Nevada and raised in Elk Grove, California, attending Elk Grove High School where he competed in wrestling. Smith then continued his career in junior college where he placed in the California State Championship.

Mixed martial arts career

Early career
In the early half of his career, Smith fought as a Heavyweight and compiled victories in the International Fighting Championships and Gladiator Challenge shows across the United States. While successful in the smaller promotions, Smith's first major appearance in the mixed martial arts world came in the World Extreme Cagefighting organization.  Smith entered a WEC Light Heavyweight tournament with limited name recognition, but was branded by experts as the dark horse of the competition.
Smith defeated WEC veteran Tim McKenzie in the semi-finals.  With that victory, Smith was slated to fight Justin Levens in the tournament finals; Levens, however, was halted on doctor's advice due to a shoulder injury he sustained in his semi-final bout.  The tournament alternate, Tait Fletcher, was brought into the championship round instead.  Smith made short work of Fletcher, scoring a first-round technical knockout to become the WEC Light Heavyweight Champion.

Smith would defend his championship from Justin Levens at WEC 18 before scheduling a fight with the Ultimate Fighting Championship in April 2006, moving down a weight class to fight David Terrell at UFC 59.  The fight – marked with questionable officiating – ended in controversial fashion, prompting Smith to file a complaint with the California State Athletic Commission. The referee called for a break, which Smith adhered to but Terrell did not hear. When Smith stopped fighting, Terrell quickly locked in a rear naked choke, which the referee did not break. Smith was forced to tap out and protested immediately.

Smith was then seen as a middleweight contestant on The Ultimate Fighter: The Comeback, where he quickly lost his quarterfinal matchup against Travis Lutter.  Smith appeared on the season finale, knocking out Pete Sell in the second round of a very exciting fight in a sequence that saw Smith sustain a hard punch to the liver, and throw the bout-winning knockout punch before falling to the ground in pain.

Smith lost his next fight in the UFC by decision against Patrick Cote at UFC 67.   More recently, Smith defeated Troy Miller by technical knockout at Palace Fighting Championship 2 in Lemoore, California. He lost against Ed Herman at UFC 72. Herman submitted Smith with a rear naked choke at 2:25 in the second round after Herman landed a nasty elbow on Smith in the first round covering his face in blood.

EliteXC
Smith made his EliteXC debut on February 16 knocking out Kyle Noke seven seconds into round two. The victory earned him a title shot against Robbie Lawler. The bout was declared a no contest after an accidental poke in the eye in the third round. The first two rounds were so exciting that Gary Shaw awarded both fighters their win bonuses and announced an immediate rematch.  Smith lost the subsequent rematch to Lawler via TKO on July 26, 2008, at EliteXC: Unfinished Business.

Strikeforce
At Strikeforce: Destruction, Smith took a fight with Terry Martin on one week's notice and defeated Martin via KO (punch) in the 1st round.

Smith faced Benji Radach at Strikeforce: Shamrock vs. Diaz on April 11, 2009. Smith defeated Radach by knocking him out in the third round. Radach had, for the majority of the fight, showcased his ability as the more refined striker, and was arguably heading toward a unanimous decision victory until Smith caught him with a flush straight right late on in round three and followed up with strikes to seal a dramatic victory.
On June 6, 2009, Smith was matched up with Nick Diaz at a catchweight of 180 lb. during Strikeforce: Lawler vs. Shields, losing via rear naked choke at 1:19 of the third round.

Smith fought Cung Le at Strikeforce: Evolution on December 19, 2009. Despite being dominated throughout most of the fight, Smith won via third round knock out and became the first man to ever defeat Cung Le. Smith fought Le again in a rematch with at Strikeforce: Fedor vs. Werdum on June 26, 2010. Smith lost by second round KO.

Smith fought Paul Daley in a welterweight bout on December 4, 2010, at Strikeforce: Henderson vs. Babalu II. Daley defeated Smith via one punch KO in the first round. As Smith was throwing a punch, Daley caught him with a hook.

Smith took some time off after his loss to Daley, trying to heal up some injuries and rejuvenate his ground game. He faced Tarec Saffiedine at Welterweight at the Strikeforce: Fedor vs. Henderson event.  He lost the bout via unanimous decision.

After an 8-month layoff, Smith faced Lumumba Sayers at Strikeforce: Tate vs. Rousey. He lost via submission (guillotine choke) in round one, suffering his fourth loss in a row.

Post-Strikeforce career
Smith was expected to face Marcus Gaines at Gladiator Challenge on June 23, 2012, but an injury during training forced him to withdraw from the bout.

Smith faced Mark Matthews on August 3, 2013, at WCFC 6 for the WCFC Middleweight Championship. He won the fight via second round TKO. He was then expected to face Max Griffin at WCFC 8 on February 15, 2014, however the bout was cancelled prior to the event.

Personal life
Smith has two sons. Smith has a younger brother, Shawn, who is also a mixed martial artist. He also has three sisters and an older brother.

Championships and accomplishments
West Coast Fighting Championship
WCFC Middleweight Championship (One time, current)
World Extreme Cagefighting
WEC Light Heavyweight Championship (One time)

Mixed martial arts record

|-
| Loss
| align=center| 18–11 (1)
| Justin Baesman
| TKO (punches)
| WCFC 16: King of Sacramento
| 
| align=center| 2
| align=center| 0:57
| Sacramento, California, United States
| 
|-
| Win
| align=center| 18–10 (1)
| Mark Matthews
| TKO (punches)
| WCFC 6: Matthews vs. Smith
| 
| align=center| 2
| align=center| 0:41
| Placerville, California, United States
| 
|-
| Loss
| align=center| 17–10 (1)
| Lumumba Sayers
| Submission (guillotine choke)
| Strikeforce: Tate vs. Rousey
| 
| align=center| 1
| align=center| 1:34
| Columbus, Ohio, United States
| 
|-
| Loss
| align=center| 17–9 (1)
| Tarec Saffiedine
| Decision (unanimous)
| Strikeforce: Fedor vs. Henderson
| 
| align=center| 3
| align=center| 5:00
| Hoffman Estates, Illinois, United States
| 
|-
| Loss
| align=center| 17–8 (1)
| Paul Daley
| KO (punch)
| Strikeforce: Henderson vs. Babalu II
| 
| align=center| 1
| align=center| 2:09
| St. Louis, Missouri, United States
| 
|-
| Loss
| align=center| 17–7 (1)
| Cung Le
| TKO (spinning back kick and punches)
| Strikeforce: Fedor vs. Werdum
| 
| align=center| 2
| align=center| 1:46
| San Jose, California, United States
| 
|-
| Win
| align=center| 17–6 (1)
| Cung Le
| KO/TKO (punches)
| Strikeforce: Evolution
| 
| align=center| 3
| align=center| 3:25
| San Jose, California, United States
| 
|-
| Loss
| align=center| 16–6 (1)
| Nick Diaz
| Submission (rear-naked choke)
| Strikeforce: Lawler vs. Shields
| 
| align=center| 3
| align=center| 1:19
| St. Louis, Missouri, United States
| 
|-
| Win
| align=center| 16–5 (1)
| Benji Radach
| KO (punch)
| Strikeforce: Shamrock vs. Diaz
| 
| align=center| 3
| align=center| 3:24
| San Jose, California, United States
| 
|-
| Win
| align=center| 15–5 (1)
| Terry Martin
| KO (punch)
| Strikeforce: Destruction
| 
| align=center| 1
| align=center| 0:24
| San Jose, California, United States
| 
|-
| Loss
| align=center| 14–5 (1)
| Robbie Lawler
| TKO (soccer kicks and punches)
| EliteXC: Unfinished Business
| 
| align=center| 2
| align=center| 2:35
| Stockton, California, United States
| 
|-
| NC
| align=center| 14–4 (1)
| Robbie Lawler
| NC (accidental eye poke)
| EliteXC: Primetime
| 
| align=center| 3
| align=center| 3:26
| Newark, New Jersey, United States
| 
|-
| Win
| align=center| 14–4
| Kyle Noke
| KO (punch)
| EliteXC: Street Certified
| 
| align=center| 2
| align=center| 0:07
| Miami, Florida, United States
| 
|-
| Win
| align=center| 13–4
| Jeff Morris
| KO (punch)
| GC 73: High Noon
| 
| align=center| 1
| align=center| 0:22
| Sacramento, California, United States
| 
|-
| Loss
| align=center| 12–4
| Ed Herman
| Submission (rear-naked choke)
| UFC 72
| 
| align=center| 2
| align=center| 2:25
| Belfast, Northern Ireland
| 
|-
| Win
| align=center| 12–3
| Troy Miller
| KO (punch)
| PFC 2
| 
| align=center| 1
| align=center| 1:06
| Lemoore, California, United States
| 
|-
| Loss
| align=center| 11–3
| Patrick Côté
| Decision (unanimous)
| UFC 67
| 
| align=center| 3
| align=center| 5:00
| Las Vegas, Nevada, United States
| 
|-
| Win
| align=center| 11–2
| Pete Sell
| KO (punch)
| The Ultimate Fighter: The Comeback Finale
| 
| align=center| 2
| align=center| 3:25
| Las Vegas, Nevada, United States
| 
|-
| Loss
| align=center| 10–2
| David Terrell
| Submission (rear-naked choke)
| UFC 59: Reality Check
| 
| align=center| 1
| align=center| 3:08
| Anaheim, California, United States
| 
|-
| Win
| align=center| 10–1
| Justin Levens
| KO (punches)
| WEC 18: Unfinished Business
| 
| align=center| 1
| align=center| 1:58
| Lemoore, California, United States
| 
|-
| Win
| align=center| 9–1
| Tait Fletcher
| TKO (punches)
| WEC 17
| 
| align=center| 1
| align=center| 3:55
| Lemoore, California, United States
| 
|-
| Win
| align=center| 8–1
| Tim McKenzie
| TKO (punches)
| WEC 17
| 
| align=center| 1
| align=center| 2:25
| Lemoore, California, United States
| 
|-
| Win
| align=center| 7–1
| John Seilhan
| KO (punch)
| Gladiator Challenge 30
| 
| align=center| 1
| align=center| 1:29
| Colusa, California, United States
| 
|-
| Win
| align=center| 6–1
| Isidro Gonzalez
| Submission (rear-naked choke)
| SF 3: Dome
| 
| align=center| 1
| align=center| 4:07
| Gresham, Oregon, United States
| 
|-
| Loss
| align=center| 5–1
| James Irvin
| KO (punch)
| Gladiator Challenge 22
| 
| align=center| 1
| align=center| 2:21
| Colusa, California, United States
| 
|-
| Win
| align=center| 5–0
| Jaime Jara
| Submission (rear-naked choke)
| Gladiator Challenge 20
| 
| align=center| 1
| align=center| 3:01
| Colusa, California, United States
| 
|-
| Win
| align=center| 4–0
| Jaime Jara
| TKO (punches)
| Gladiator Challenge 16
| 
| align=center| 1
| align=center| 4:13
| Colusa, California, United States
| 
|-
| Win
| align=center| 3–0
| Levi Thornbrue
| TKO (punches)
| Gladiator Challenge 10
| 
| align=center| 1
| align=center| 2:20
| Colusa, California, United States
|Heavyweight debut.
|-
| Win
| align=center| 2–0
| Tim Kennedy
| TKO (doctor stoppage)
| IFC: Warriors Challenge 15
| 
| align=center| 1
| align=center| 2:53
| Oroville, California, United States
| 
|-
| Win
| align=center| 1–0
| Ted Stamatelos
| Submission (guillotine choke)
| IFC: Warriors Challenge 13
| 
| align=center| 1
| align=center| 3:16
| California, United States
|

References

External links
 
 Archived UFC Profile

1979 births
Living people
American male mixed martial artists
Middleweight mixed martial artists
World Extreme Cagefighting champions
Heavyweight mixed martial artists
Light heavyweight mixed martial artists
Welterweight mixed martial artists
Mixed martial artists utilizing collegiate wrestling
Sportspeople from Reno, Nevada
People from Elk Grove, California
Ultimate Fighting Championship male fighters
American male sport wrestlers
Amateur wrestlers